James Brian Duncan (born March 31, 1952) is a former American football running back who played for the Cleveland Browns and Houston Oilers of the National Football League (NFL). He played college football at Southern Methodist University.

References 

1952 births
Living people
People from Olney, Texas
Players of American football from Texas
American football running backs
SMU Mustangs football players
Cleveland Browns players
Houston Oilers players
Jacksonville Express players